The Moselle is a river that rises in the Vosges mountains and flows through north-eastern France and Luxembourg to western Germany. It is a left bank tributary of the Rhine, which it joins at Koblenz. A small part of Belgium is in its basin as it includes the Sauer and the Our.

Its lower course "twists and turns its way between Trier and Koblenz along one of Germany's most beautiful river valleys." In this section the land to the north is the Eifel which stretches into Belgium; to the south lies the Hunsrück. The river flows through a region that was cultivated by the Romans. Today, its hillsides are covered by terraced vineyards where "some of the best Rieslings grow". Many castle ruins sit on the hilltops above wine villages and towns along the slopes. Traben-Trarbach with its art nouveau architecture and Bernkastel-Kues with its traditional market square are two of the many tourist attractions on the Moselle river.

Name 
The name Moselle is derived from the Celtic name form, Mosela, via the Latin Mosella, a diminutive form of Mosa, the Latin description of the Meuse, which used to flow parallel to the Moselle. So the Mosella was the "Little Meuse".

The Moselle is first recorded by Tacitus in Book 13 of his Annals and in Book 4 of his Histories.

The Roman poet Ausonius made it a literary theme as early as the 4th century. In his poem dated 371, called Mosella, which was published in 483 hexameters, this poet of the Late Antiquity and teacher at the Trier Imperial Court (Kaiserhof) described a journey from Bingen over the Hunsrück hills to the Moselle and then following its course to Trier on the road named after him, the Via Ausonius. Ausonius describes flourishing and rich landscapes along the river and in the valley of the Moselle, thanks to the policies of their Roman rulers.

The river subsequently gave its name to two French republican départements: Moselle and Meurthe-et-Moselle.

Geography

The Moselle flows through the Lorraine region, west of the Vosges. Further downstream, in Germany, the Moselle valley forms the division between the Eifel and Hunsrück mountain regions.

River sections 
The section of the Moselle from the France–Germany–Luxembourg tripoint near Schengen to its confluence with the Saar near Konz shortly before Trier is in Germany known (geographically incorrectly) as the Upper Moselle. The section from Trier to Pünderich is the Middle Moselle, the section between Pünderich and its mouth in Koblenz as the Lower Moselle or Terraced Moselle (Terrassenmosel). Characteristic of the Middle and Lower Moselle are its wide meanders cut deeply into the highlands of the Rhenish Massif, the most striking of which is the Cochemer Krampen between Bremm and Cochem. Also typical are its vineyard terraces.

From the tripoint the Moselle marks the entire Saarland–Luxembourg border.

Catchment 
The German state of Rhineland-Palatinate has , the Saarland , Luxembourg , Wallonia in Belgium  and North Rhine-Westphalia, .

Tributaries 
The three largest tributaries of the Moselle are, in alphabetical order, the Meurthe, the Saar and the Sauer. The Meurthe was the old upper course of the Moselle, until the latter captured the former upper reaches of the Meuse and took it over. However, the Meuse only delivered a little more water than the Meurthe at its confluence. The Saar is the biggest of all the tributaries as well as the longest. The Sauer is the largest left-hand tributary and drains the region on either side of the German-Luxembourg border. The largest tributary relative to the Moselle at its confluence is the  Moselotte, which is about 40% greater by volumetric flow and thus represents the main branch of the Moselle system.

List of tributaries 
From the left
Madon,
Terrouin,
Esch,
Rupt de Mad,
Orne,
Fensch,
Gander,
Syre,
Sauer,
Kyll,
Salm,
Lieser,
Alf,
Endert,
Brohlbach,
Elz.

From the right
Moselotte,
Vologne,
Meurthe,
Seille,
Saar,
Olewiger Bach,
Avelsbach,
Ruwer,
Feller Bach,
Dhron,
Ahringsbach,
Kautenbach,
Lützbach,
Flaumbach,
Altlayer Bach,
Baybach,
Ehrbach.

Towns 
Towns along the Moselle are:
 in France: Épinal, Toul, Pont-à-Mousson, Metz and Thionville
 in Luxembourg: Schengen, Remich, Grevenmacher and Wasserbillig
 in Germany: Konz, Trier, Schweich, Bernkastel-Kues, Traben-Trarbach, Zell, Cochem and Koblenz

Adjacent mountain ranges 
From Trier downstream the Moselle separates the two Central Upland ranges of the Eifel (to the northwest) and the Hunsrück (to the southeast).

Geology 
The Vosges, the present source region of the Moselle, were formed about 50 million years ago. In the Miocene and Pliocene epochs the ancient Moselle (Urmosel) was already a tributary of the ancient Rhine (Ur-Rhein). When, in the Quaternary period, the Rhenish Massif slowly rose, the meanders of the Moselle were formed between the Trier Valley and the Neuwied Basin.

Water levels 

High water:
 , Trier Gauge on 21 December 1993
 , Trier Gauge on 28 May 1983
 , Trier Gauge on 23 January 1995
 , Trier Gauge on 12 April 1983
 , Trier Gauge on 27 February 1997

Low water:
  in Bernkastel on 28 July 1921

History 

The Moselle was known to the Romans by the name of Flumen Musalla (in the Tabula Peutingeriana), and the river was romanticised by the poet Ausonius around 371. From 1815, the Moselle formed the border between the Grand Duchy of Luxembourg and Prussia (German Empire in 1871).

In the act of 10 April 1952 ratifying the treaty instituted by the ECSC, Article 2 charged the French Government "to initiate, before the establishment of the Common Market, negotiations with the governments concerned in order to achieve a rapid implementation of the canalisation of the Moselle between Thionville and Koblenz.

The River was canalised between Metz and Thionville, via a canal opened in 1964 by the Grand Duchess, Charlotte of Luxembourg, the Federal Chancellor of Germany, Konrad Adenauer and their host, Charles de Gaulle, President of France.

It is on the Moselle, at the site of the France–Germany–Luxembourg tripoint, that the Schengen Agreement was signed in 1992, establishing the free movement of goods and people in the European Community.

Economy 
The Moselle valley between Metz and Thionville is an industrial area, with coal mining and steel manufacturers.

The Moselle valley is famous for its scenery and wine. Most well-known is the German Mosel wine region, while the Luxembourg winegrowing region is called Moselle Luxembourgeoise and the French region is called AOC Moselle. Most notable among the wines produced here are Riesling, Elbling, Müller-Thurgau, Kerner, and Auxerrois. The German part of the Moselle is a tourist destination.

Navigation 
After the Second World War, France pressed to be able to ply the Moselle with larger ships in order to be able to link the industrial regions of Lorraine. When, in 1955, the population on the Saar voted to belong to West Germany, France demanded as "compensation" an upgrade of the Moselle. On 27 October 1956 they concluded the Moselle Treaty with Germany and Luxembourg for a canalisation of the Moselle and conceded to Germany in return the extension of the Grand Canal d'Alsace on the Upper Rhine instead of an extension of the canal via Breisach. In 1958 work began and by 26 May 1964 the Moselle could be officially opened from Metz to Koblenz as a major waterway for shipping with 14 locks. France extended it by 1979 as far as Neuves-Maisons. With that,  of the Moselle have been upgraded with a total of 28 locks. The Moselle Commission, founded in 1962 with its head office in Trier, is responsible for navigation. The Moselle Shipping Police Act which it has produced is valid in all three participant states from Metz to Koblenz.

In 1921 the Moselle (Mo) became a Reich waterway, today it is a federal waterway (Bundeswasserstraße) from Apach at the tripoint to its mouth on the Rhine at kilometre point 592.29 in Koblenz. It is categorized as a European waterway of Class Vb. Its kilometrage begins at its mouth at kilometre point 0 and runs upstream. The International Moselle Company, initially set up in 1957 to finance the construction of the river's upgrade, manages the shipping charges and the operation and maintenance of the waterway which they are used to fund.

For smaller ships it is connected to other parts of France through the Canal de la Meuse and the Canal de la Marne au Rhin. There are locks in Koblenz, Lehmen, Müden, Fankel, Sankt Aldegund, Enkirch, Zeltingen, Wintrich, Detzem, Trier, Grevenmacher, Palzem, Apach, Kœnigsmacker, Thionville, Richemont, Talange, Metz, Ars-sur-Moselle, Pagny-sur-Moselle, Blénod-lès-Pont-à-Mousson, Custines, Pompey, Aingeray, Fontenoy-sur-Moselle, Toul, Villey-le-Sec, and Neuves-Maisons.

By 1970 more than 10 million tonnes of goods were being transported on the Moselle, the majority on towed barges. Upstream freight mainly comprised fuel and ores; downstream the main goods were steel products, gravel and rocks. There is an inland port at Trier, a transshipment site in Zell (Mosel); and there are other ports in Mertert, Thionville, Metz and Frouard. In addition to freighters there are also pleasure boats for tourists between the very busy wine villages and small towns of the Middle and Lower Moselle.
There are also yachting or sports marinas in the following places: Koblenz, Winningen, Brodenbach, Burgen, Löf, Hatzenport, Senheim, Treis, Traben-Trarbach, Kues, Neumagen, Pölich, Schweich, Trier and Konz. The Moselle is linked near Toul via the Canal de la Marne au Rhin with inter alia the Meuse, the Saône and the Rhône. Other canals link the river to the North Sea and even the Mediterranean.

Locks and dams (weirs) 

There is a total of 28 changes of level on the Moselle:
 16 in France near Neuves-Maisons, Villey-le-Sec, Toul, Fontenoy-sur-Moselle, Aingeray, Frouard-Pompey, Custines, Blénod-lès-Pont-à-Mousson, Pagny-sur-Moselle, Ars-sur-Moselle, Metz, Talange, Richemont, Thionville, Kœnigsmacker and Apach
 2 between Luxembourg and Germany near Stadtbredimus-Palzem and Grevenmacher-Wellen
 10 in Germany near Trier, Detzem, Wintrich, Zeltingen, Enkirch, St. Aldegund, Fankel, Müden, Lehmen and Koblenz. Detzem is the highest lock –  – and at  the upstream reach is the longest on the river; it is the only lock to be built on a canal of some length excavated outside the river bed.

With the exception of Detzem, all the structures at each change in level are laid out side by side; the lock is by one riverbank, the weir in the middle and the hydropower plant on the other bank. Between the lock and weir are a boat slipway and channel and boat lock, while between the weir and the power station is the fish ladder. The structures have been blended into the landscape through their low-level design; this was achieved by the choice of sector gates for the weir, vertically lowering upper gates and mitred lower lock gates. The water levels and hydropower works are controlled by the Fankel Central Control Station (Zentralwarte Fankel) of the RWE Power Company at Fankel.

Tourism 

Between Koblenz and Trier, large sections run on the trackbed of the old Moselle Valley Railway, far from the noise and fumes of motor vehicles.

A number of notable castles and ruins adorn the heights above the Moselle valley and many are visible on a boat trip on the Moselle.

Another unusual trail runs from Ediger-Eller via the Calmont Trail to Bremm through the steepest vineyard in Europe.

Before the construction of barrages the Moselle was a popular route for folding kayaks which is why many of the weirs have boat channels. The river is still used today by canoeists, especially during the annual week-long lock closures when no commercial shipping is permitted.

Numerous Moselle Trail "partner trails", the so-called side branches (Seitensprünge) and "dream paths" (Traumpfade) enhance the hiking network in the Moselle Valley.

The ADAC's Rallye Deutschland has taken place since 2000 in the vineyards along the Moselle at Veldenz, Dhron, Piesport, Minheim, Kesten, Trittenheim, Fell, Ruwertal and Trier.

At Koblenz Locks the Mosellum offers exhibitions about the migration of fish in the Moselle as well as water ecology, navigation and power generation. With the construction of the visitor and information centre the most modern fish ladder along the Moselle was opened.

Wine 

The German Moselle wine region, including its tributaries, bears the growing and manufacturing name of "Mosel". For marketing reasons the agricultural authorities of the region have divided it into six winegrowing areas. The wine literature and specialist press, by contrast, divide the region into four areas based on geomorphological, micro-climatic and also historical reasons:

 Upper Moselle The valley sides of the Upper Moselle (also called the Burgundy Moselle, Burgundermosel) with their overwhelmingly muschelkalk soils belong geologically to the so-called Paris Basin, which explains its low proportion of Riesling – only around 10% in 2010 – and the increasing cultivation of Pinot Blanc and Pinot Noir grapes.

 Trier Region Around the city of Trier and in the valleys of the Saar and Ruwer with their side valleys, the Riesling is the predominant grape on the shale soils, with over 80% of the crop. One climatic feature of this area is the frequent orientation of often small southwest-southeast facing locations in which the vegetation is exposed to stronger, cooler winds and, especially in the light of recent global warming, often achieve lower degrees of maturity than in the narrow, often deeply incised valley of the Middle and Lower Moselle.

According to the wine experts and trade, the "greatest" wines of the Moselle, both in quantity and quality, are grown here on land that has been consolidated into large concerns with much vaunted steeply sloped vineyards.

 Lower Moselle In the Lower Moselle Valley, there are a number of medieval castles, high above little villages, decorated with timber-framed houses, surrounded by steep slopes with small terraces in the narrow, winding valley. Here, cultivating vines is very labour-intensive and costly and it is difficult to make it economical. As a result, it is common for vineyards to fall into ruin here.

The wine industry on the German Moselle has been declining for decades. The vineyards that have fallen fallow are mostly those on extremely steep hillsides. There has been a major decline in the number of so-called Nebenerwerbswinzer (vintners for whom it is a secondary occupation), and the small, family farming operations that, until the end of the 1960s formed the majority of wine businesses. Comparative figures by the Chamber of Agriculture for Rhineland-Palatinate for several wine villages on the Lower Moselle show that there were still 797 wine businesses in the early 1960s, but by the early 2000s there were only just under 100.

There has been the opposite trend amongst the established traditional wine estates and more recent vintners with a sound education in oenology and business management, who have increased their business through the reclamation of once renowned, but long forgotten sites. The end of the  20th century saw the rediscovery of the use of special terroir in order to improve quality and value, which has led to a more nuanced view of Moselle wine that, a few years before, had been characterised by overproduction, label scandals and cheap offers.

Moselle umbrella brand 
On 10 November 2006 in Burg, the Moselle Regional Initiative was founded. The introduction of the Moselle as an umbrella brand was based on that of the Eifel region and covers products and services from the areas of agriculture, forestry, tourism, handicrafts and nature.

Moselle slate 
Moselle slate (Moselschiefer) is a manufacturing and trade description for slate from the municipalities of Mayen, Polch, Müllenbach, Trier and its surrounding area. The name is derived from the historical transport route for this slate along the Moselle to the Lower Rhine.

Railways 
The following railway lines run or ran along the river:

 Koblenz–Trier railway (Moselstrecke), between Koblenz and Bullay, and in Trier, mostly on the left (northern) bank
 Pünderich–Traben-Trarbach railway, for its entire length, on the left (northern) bank
 Moselle Railway, between Bullay and Trier, on the right (southern) bank. Closed in the 1960s.
 Trier West Railway, between Ehrang and Igel, on the left (northern) bank
 Thionville–Trier railway (Obermoselstrecke), for its entire length, on the right (eastern) bank
 CFL line 1a, between Wasserbillig and Grevenmacher, on the left (western) bank. No passenger service remains.
 Metz–Luxembourg railway, between Thionville and Metz, mainly on the left bank
 Lérouville–Metz railway, between Metz and Novéant, mainly on the left bank
 Frouard–Novéant railway, mainly on the left bank
 Paris–Strasbourg railway, between Frouard and Toul
 Blainville-Damelevières–Lure railway, between Bayon and Épinal
 Épinal–Bussang railway, between Épinal and Remiremont, on the left bank

Literature
Mosella, a Latin poem by Ausonius (4th century). 
In the tale, "The Seven Swabians" of the Brothers Grimm, these Swabians drown trying to cross the Moselle.
Accounts of the river, its folklore and local history appear in Small Boat on the Moselle a 1968 book by Roger Pilkington.

Castles

Château de Meinsberg (dit de Malbrouck): near Manderen, this castle was built in the 15th century but rebuilt in the 1990s. Today it is used for numerous cultural events.
Château Fort de Sierck-les-Bains: situated just on the French-German border at Sierck-les-Bains, this fortress of the Duke of Lorraine dates back to the 11th century. Most of today's castle was constructed in the 18th century, following plans from Vauban.
Schloss Berg: a Renaissance castle at Nennig, today a hotel and a casino.
Alte Burg: a manor house built in 1360 at Longuich. One of the few surviving manor houses in rural Rhineland-Palatinate.
Schloss Lieser: a palace at Lieser built from 1884 to 1887 in historistic style.
Landshut Castle: a castle built by the Electorate of Trier in the 13th century at Bernkastel-Kues.
Grevenburg: ruins of a castle at Traben-Trarbach built by Johann III of Sponheim-Starkenburg about 1350, destroyed, after many sieges, in 1734.
Marienburg: a 12th-century castle and later monastery near Pünderich and Alf.
Arras Castle: a 12th-century castle in Alf.
Metternich Castle: a castle built around 1120 at Beilstein, today partly in ruins.
Cochem Castle: The castle in Cochem was originally built in the 11th century, but was completely destroyed by French soldiers in 1689. The present castle was rebuilt later in the 19th century.
Thurant Castle: Above the town of Alken is Thurant Castle, built in the 13th century. It is the only twin-towered castle along the Moselle. The fortress was built by the Count Palatine Henry of the house of Guelph between 1198 and 1206. From 1246 to 1248, it was the two archbishops of Cologne and Trier. Following conquest, it was divided by a partition wall into two halves, each with a keep (tower). During the 19th century, Thurant disintegrated, becoming a ruin; and in 1911 was acquired by Privy Councilor, Dr. Robert Allmers, who had it rebuilt. Since 1973, the castle has been owned by the Allmers and Wulf families.
Ehrenburg: a 12th-century castle built by the Electorate of Trier at Brodenbach.
Eltz Castle: The von Eltz family castle, whose history dates back to the 12th century. It remains in private hands to this day but it is open to visitors.
Lower and Upper Castle, Kobern-Gondorf: two 11th-century castles, today mostly in ruins.
Pyrmont Castle: This 13th-century castle near Roes was remodelled and extended several times during the Baroque era.
Bischofstein Castle: Across the river from the municipality of Burgen is this 13th-century castle, which was destroyed during the Nine Years' War, but was reconstructed and now serves as a retreat centre for the Fichte Gymnasium in Krefeld.

References

 von Apach am Dreiländereck bis zu ihrer Mündung in den Rhein bei Rhein-km 592,29

Bibliography 
 Decimius Magnus Ausonius: Mosella [Description of a journey by ship on the Moselle around 371 A. D.] http://www.perseus.tufts.edu/hopper/text?doc=Perseus:text:2008.01.0619
 Jakob Hölscher (ed.): Das Moselthal von Trier bis Coblenz. In malerischen Ansichten, nach der Natur gezeichnet von C. Bodmer, in acqua tinta geätzt von R. Bodmer. 30 pages. Koblenz, 1831–1833
 Johann August Klein: Moselthal zwischen Koblenz und Konz, printed by Heriot, Coblenz, 1831
 Johann August Klein: Das Moselthal zwischen Koblenz und Zell mit Städten, Ortschaften, Ritterburgen, historisch, topographisch, malerisch. Heriot, Koblenz, 1831
 Wilhelm Haag: Ausonius und seine Mosella. Gaertner, Berlin, 1900
 Michael Gerhard: Die Mosel, dargestellt in ihrem Lauf, ihrer Entstehung und ihrer Bedeutung für den Menschen. Prüm, 1910. Online edition dilibri Rhineland-Palatinate
 Carl Hauptmann: Die Mosel von Cochem bis Bernkastel. Bonn 1910. Online edition dilibri Rhineland-Palatinate
 Carl Hauptmann: Die Mosel von Coblenz bis Cochem in Wanderbildern. Bonn, 1911. Online edition dilibri Rhineland-Palatinate
 Ludwig Mathar: Die Mosel (Die Rheinlande, Bilder von Land, Volk und Kunst, Zweiter Band: Die Mosel) Cologne o. J. (around 1925), 607 S. (with 117 illustrations and a map of the Moselle Valley from Trier to Coblenz)
 Rudolf G. Binding: Moselfahrt aus Liebeskummer – Novelle einer Landschaft, Frankfurt am Main, 1933 (51.–75. Tausend)
 Josef Adolf Schmoll alias Eisenwerth: Die Mosel von der Quelle bis zum Rhein (Deutsche Lande – Deutsche Kunst). 2nd edition, Munich/Berlin, 1972
 Willy Leson (ed.): Romantische Reise durch das Moseltal-Von Koblenz nach Trier (with graphics by Carl Bodmer and text by Johann August Klein and Christian von Stramberg), Cologne, 1978
 Heinz Cüppers, Gérard Collot, Alfons Kolling, Gérard Thill (Red.): Die Römer an Mosel und Saar (Zeugnisse der Römerzeit in Lothringen, in Luxemburg, im Raum Trier und im Saarland), Mainz, 1983, Zabern: 2nd revised edition (with 46 colour and 346 black and white photographs)
 Heinz Held: Die Mosel von der Mündung bei Koblenz bis zur Quelle in den Vogesen: Landschaft, Kultur, Geschichte (DuMont-Kunst-Reiseführer). 3rd edition, Cologne, 1989
 Jean-Claude Bonnefont, Hubert Collin (dir.), Meurthe-et-Moselle, edition Bonneton, Paris, 1996, 318 pages. 
 M. Eckoldt (ed.), Flüsse und Kanäle, Die Geschichte der deutschen Wasserstraßen, DSV-Verlag, 1998
 Ulrich Nonn: Eine Moselreise im 4. Jahrhundert-Decimus Magnus Ausonius und seine "Mosella". In: Koblenzer Beiträge zur Geschichte und Kultur, Vol. 8, Koblenz: Görres-Verlag 2000, pp. 8–24 (with map and illustrations)
 Reinhold Schommers: Die Mosel (DuMont-Reise-Taschenbücher). DuMont, Ostfildern 2001, 
 Ludwin Vogel: Deutschland, Frankreich und die Mosel. Europäische Integrationspolitik in den Montan-Regionen Ruhr, Lothringen, Luxemburg und der Saar. Klartext, Essen, 2001, 
 Decimius Magnus Ausonius: Mosella. Lateinisch-deutsch. Published, translated and commented on by Paul Dräger. Tusculum Studienausgaben. Artemis und Winkler, Düsseldorf, 2004, 
 Uwe Anhäuser: Die Ausoniusstraße. Ein archäologischer Reise- und Wanderführer. Rhein-Mosel, Alf/Mosel, 2006, 
 Karl-Josef Gilles: Das Moseltal zwischen Koblenz und Trier 1920 bis 1950 (series of archive photographs), Sutton, Erfurt, 2006, .
 Wasser- und Schifffahrtsdirektion Südwest: Kompendium der Wasser- und Schifffahrtsdirektion Südwest. Organisatorische und technische Daten, Binnenschifffahrt, Aufgaben, Wasserstraßen. self-publication, Mainz, June 2007
 Alexander Thon / Stefan Ulrich: Von den Schauern der Vorwelt umweht... Burgen und Schlösser an der Mosel. Schnell + Steiner, Regensburg 2007, 1st edition, 180 pp. numerous photographs, 2 overview maps of the Moselle
 Wolfgang Lambrecht: Malerische Mosel – Gemälde und Druckgraphik aus 100 Jahren, [Farbbroschüre mit Werken u. a. von Carl Bodmer, Clarkson Stanfield, Rowbotham, Compton, Wolfsberger, Benekkenstein, Burger, Thoma, Nonn, Möhren, Zysing und Bayer, published by the Sparkasse Mittelmosel and the Lions-Förderverein Cochem], Cochem, 2007
 Karl-Josef Schäfer und Wolfgang Welter: Ein Jakobsweg von Koblenz-Stolzenfels nach Trier. Der Pilgerwanderführer für den Mosel-Camino. Books on Demand, Norderstedt, 2009 (2nd updated edition) 
 Xavier Deru: Die Römer an Maas und Mosel, Zabern-Verlag, Mainz, 2010
 Groben, Josef: Mosella. Historisch-kulturelle Monographie, Trier, 2011, 311 pp., 237 photographs.
 Stefan Barme: Nacktarsch, Viez und Ledertanga – Ausflüge in die Kulturgeschichte des Mosellandes. Stephan Moll Verlag, 2012 (1st edition) 
 Joachim Gruber: Decimus Magnus Ausonius, "Mosella" Kritische Ausgabe, Übersetzung, Kommentar. Walter de Gruyter, Berlin. Series: Texts and commentaries, Vol. 42, 2013, XI, 370 pp.

External links
 mosel.de, mosel.de
 Die Mosel, die-mosel.de
 Moseltal, moseltal.de
 www.mosel.com, mosel.com
 HoloGuides – Moselle, hologuides.com
 River Moselle guide to the French section; maps and information on places, ports and moorings on the river from Neuves-Maisons to Apach, by the author of Inland Waterways of France, Imray
 Navigation details for 80 French rivers and canals (French waterways website section)
 Bibliography on Water Resources and International Law Peace Palace Library at ppl.nl
 Livecam Moselle river, webcam.cochem.c
 German-Luxembourgish-French Mosel Agency (in German/French)
 German Waterways Agency Trier (Wasser- und Schifffahrtsamt Trier) (in German)

 
Rivers of Luxembourg
Rivers of Rhineland-Palatinate
Rivers of Saarland
Rivers of France
Grevenmacher
Remich
 
Germany–Luxembourg border
International rivers of Europe
Federal waterways in Germany
Rivers of Grand Est
Rivers of Vosges (department)
Rivers of Meurthe-et-Moselle
Rivers of Moselle (department)
Rivers of Germany
Border rivers